Noel Wilby  (1914 – 1975)  was an Australian police officer and chief commissioner of Victoria Police from 1969 to 1971.

Wilby, the son of a butcher from Bendigo, joined Victoria Police in 1938. Wilby served on the beat, in the homicide squad and in the wireless squad. In 1963, he was promoted to assistant commissioner and given responsibility for traffic and technical matters.  In 1968 he was appointed to deputy commissioner and one year later was appointed chief commissioner on the resignation of Rupert Arnold. 

Poor health affected Wilby's term as chief commissioner. He suffered from hypertension and in 1970, a heart attack. In 1971 Wilby retired from the force, on the advice of his doctor.

Honours and awards

References 

1914 births
1975 deaths
Chief Commissioners of Victoria Police
Australian recipients of the Queen's Police Medal
Lieutenants of the Royal Victorian Order
People from Melbourne